Syncopacma ussuriella is a moth of the family Gelechiidae. It was described by Aristide Caradja in 1920. It is found in the Russian Far East.

References

Moths described in 1920
Syncopacma